The Lisbon University Stadium is a unit within the University of Lisbon, and a multivenue park located in Alvalade, Lisbon, comprising several sports facilities, and mostly known for its main venue and namesake, the Estádio de Honra, a multi-use stadium. It also includes several indoors arenas, tennis courts, football fields, a golf course, a swimming pool complex and a medical centre. It was under direct government management until 2013, when it was integrated in the university.

History
The stadium was created as part of the Cidade Universitária de Lisboa, the university campus promoted by the Estado Novo to house (most) faculties of the University of Lisbon. It was built following a plan by architects João Simões and Norberto Correia and was inaugurated on May 7, 1956.

In 1962 the stadium was one of the main stages of the Academic Crisis that would eventually lead to the resignation of the then-Rector of the university (and later Prime Minister of Portugal) Marcello Caetano.

Venues

Estádio de Honra
The capacity of the Estádio de Honra is 8,000 spectators. It is used as the home stadium of Portugal national rugby union team matches. It also hosted the 1994 World Junior Championships in Athletics.

Lusitanos XV
The Rugby governing body ERC announced on September 2 that the Portuguese representative club Lusitanos XV would hold their home games of the 2013-14 Amlin Challenge Cup at Estádio Nacional. However, all their home games of the 2013-14 Amlin Challenge Cup were played at the Estádio Universitário de Lisboa instead of Estádio Nacional.

Swimming pools
The swimming pool complex was built in 1995-97 following a project by Frederico Valsassina Arquitectos. It opened in 1997 and includes a 50-metre olympic indoor pool.

References

External links
Estádio Universitário de Lisboa (Official website)

Sports venues in Lisbon
Rugby union stadiums in Portugal
American football venues in Portugal
1956 establishments in Portugal
Sports venues completed in 1956
Multi-purpose stadiums in Portugal
Athletics (track and field) venues in Portugal